James Laurence Balsillie (born February 3, 1961) is a Canadian businessman and philanthropist. He is the former Chair and co-CEO of the Canadian technology company Research In Motion (Blackberry), which at its prime made over $20B in sales annually.

Since leaving Blackberry in 2012, Balsillie has taken up a number of roles in Canadian business and society. He is the founder of the Balsillie School of International Affairs at the University of Waterloo, the Centre for International Governance and Innovation (CIGI) think tank, and serves as Chair of the Canadian Council of Innovators.

Early life
Balsillie was born to an Ontario Hydro electrician in Seaforth, Ontario. He received a Bachelor of Commerce degree from Trinity College at the University of Toronto in 1984, where he was also a member of the elite Zeta Psi fraternity. He earned an MBA from Harvard Business School in 1989.

Adult life

Balsillie was hired by Mike Lazaridis in 1992, when Research In Motion (RIM), an early venture into handheld telephony technology, had 14 employees. RIM would eventually become the "international powerhouse" called BlackBerry Limited, and have as many as 18,000 employees. Both men prospered from this companionship, with Lazaridis looking after the technological side while Balsillie looked after the sales business and accounting end of things.

At RIM

Many people considered that Balsillie infused RIM with "institutional arrogance" as he remade the landscape of the smartphone industry. He was "feared and respected" by senior managers within his hierarchy. The twin-CEO structure that was evolved by Lazaridis and Balsillie eventually became cumbersome and inhibited their competition with their new rival Apple, as piloted by Steve Jobs.

In June 2007, Apple brought to market the first reliable touchscreen smartphone, while Steve Ballmer of Microsoft discarded the idea, and Barack Obama professed his love for his BlackBerry. BlackBerry would not have a reliable touch-screen smartphone until after Balsillie's departure from the executive suite.

On March 5, 2007, Balsillie resigned his role as chairman of RIM as the firm reported over US$250 million in past stock option accounting errors after an extensive review. He retained his roles as co-chief executive and director. On May 17, 2007, RIM announced that "Consistent with current best practices in corporate governance, the roles of Chairman and CEO have been separated.".

In February 2009, as part of the penalties and sanctions approved by the OSC in settling the improper option practices, which the OSC called a "fundamental failure of governance", Balsillie was forced to resign as a director of RIM. In May 2010, almost immediately after the OSC sanctions expired, Balsillie was reappointed to the board, in spite of strong shareholder objections, and notwithstanding RIM's earlier public representations that the roles of Chairman and CEO were separated.

BlackBerry lost its market dominance to Google's Android technology in 2010, when the operating system of the machine was a decade old and in need of an update.

At the end of 2011, Balsillie held in the company 5.1% of the outstanding shares. This ranked him third. But that June, BlackBerry cut 2,000 employees, or 11% of its global workforce, and the joint CEOs reduced their pay to $1. The share value had tumbled from $137.41 in 2008 to $14.80 at the end of 2011. By then, the iPhone from Apple had launched and cornered the apps market, and some investors called for resignations from the executive suite.

On January 22, 2012, Balsillie resigned his position, as did Co-CEO Mike Lazaridis, and was replaced by RIM Chief Operating Officer Thorsten Heins.

On March 29, 2012, Research in Motion announced that Balsillie would be stepping down from the Board of Directors. He resigned from the Board due to strategic differences with RIM's new leader and CEO, Thorsten Heins, who abandoned the licensing strategy that Balsillie was pursuing.

One publication blamed on "managerial gridlock" and deteriorating product quality BlackBerry's fall from grace in the years from 2010 to 2013 and beyond.

The decline was steep for RIM. In the span of five years, the company had gone from Canada's most-valuable property, surpassing even the biggest bank, to a tenth of its former value.

Balsillie commercialised 44,000 patents during his career at RIM, and claims he is "the largest commercial IP protagonist in the history of [Canada]."

Rejections by NHL owners' club
Balsillie has been involved in three attempts to buy a National Hockey League franchise with the overt intention of moving it to Hamilton, Ontario. On October 5, 2006, Balsillie made a bid to purchase the Pittsburgh Penguins franchise for US$185 million from former player Mario Lemieux and his partners. On December 15, 2006, Balsillie withdrew his bid to buy the team after receiving notice from NHL commissioner Gary Bettman that the league would negotiate the arena deal on his behalf and the league also wanted the right to take over the team if necessary.

On May 23, 2007, it was announced that Balsillie had reached a tentative agreement to buy the Nashville Predators from Craig Leipold. On June 28, 2007, CBC.ca reported that Leipold had decided not to sign a binding agreement with Balsillie. Though Balsillie offered lip service that he would keep the team in Nashville, he reactivated a deal to become the primary tenant of Copps Coliseum in Hamilton and was already selling season tickets in the latter city, which influenced the decision to deny Basillie the Predators.

On May 5, 2009, Balsillie made an offer of $212.5 million to purchase the Phoenix Coyotes following the team's filing for bankruptcy protection in Arizona. In a press release from Toronto, Ontario, the offer to purchase was described as conditional on relocation to Southern Ontario. At the request of then-owner, Jerry Moyes, Balsillie agreed to post debtor-in-possession financing of US$17.0 million to allow the Coyotes to operate in advance of a restructuring or a sale. A few hours later, the NHL, citing a proxy agreement signed by Moyes, removed him from all decision-making regarding the future of the Coyotes. On June 15, 2009, Judge Redfield T. Baum rejected Balsillie's bid to purchase the Coyotes from the bankruptcy trustee. Judge Baum's ruling stated that he did not have the power to force the team to move and that Balsillie's June 29 deadline did not give the court enough time to resolve all the issues in the case. On September 30, 2009, Balsillie's bid was again rejected by Judge Baum, who also rejected the NHL's bid. Balsillie's bid was rejected "with prejudice," preventing him from making another bid for the Coyotes. Balsillie did not appeal the ruling.

It was rumored that Balsillie made an unnamed bid to purchase the Buffalo Sabres during their sale in 2011 to Terry Pegula. It was also rumored that Balsillie was interested in purchasing the Atlanta Thrashers prior to their eventual purchase, relocation, and rebranding as the Winnipeg Jets by True North Sports & Entertainment, but neither of these rumors was confirmed.

Philanthropic work and awards 

In 2007, Balsillie donated $50 million to the University of Waterloo, Wilfrid Laurier University and the Centre for International Governance Innovation as part of a $100 million initiative to create the Balsillie School of International Affairs.

Balsillie is a philanthropist who supports numerous local and national initiatives. Balsillie's success at RIM has allowed him to create CIGI, CIC, and to contribute resources and time to organizations such as Waterloo Children's Museum, Grand River Hospital, the Canadian Olympic Foundation and others. Balsillie is the founder of the Centre for International Governance Innovation (CIGI), the Council of Canadian Innovators, Canadian International Council (CIC), and the Balsillie School of International Affairs (BSIA).

In June 2013, the Harper government appointed Balsillie as Chair of Sustainable Development Technology Canada.

In 2021, Balsillie was announced as the sponsor for the $60,000 Atwood Gibson Writers' Trust Fiction Prize. He also funds the Writers' Trust of Canada's $25,000 Balsillie Prize for Public Policy.

Friendships and allegiances
Balsillie counts Tim Berners-Lee, George Soros, Gord Sinclair, Roger McNamee and Geoff Cape amongst his friends. He maintains that all three major political parties have made unsuccessful efforts to recruit him. He serves as the Honorary Captain of HMCS Star in the Royal Canadian Navy.

References

External links
 
 
 Jim Balsillie at The Canadian Encyclopedia
 

1961 births
Businesspeople from Ontario
21st-century Canadian philanthropists
Harvard Business School alumni
Living people
People from Huron County, Ontario
People from Waterloo, Ontario
Directors of BlackBerry Limited
Trinity College (Canada) alumni
University of Toronto alumni
Canadian billionaires
Canadian accountants
Canadian chief executives
Canadian expatriates in the United States
Institute for New Economic Thinking